Brod, formerly Bosanski Brod ("The Bosnian Boat") is a town and municipality located in northern Republika Srpska, an entity of Bosnia and Herzegovina. It is situated on the south bank of the river Sava, in the western part of the Posavina region. As of 2013, the town has a population of 7,637 inhabitants, while the municipality has a population of  16,619 inhabitants.

Name
Prior to the Bosnian War of the 1990s, the town was known as Bosanski Brod. During the war the prefix "Bosanski" was replaced with "Srpski" due to the town being under Serb control. In May 2009, the National Assembly of the Republika Srpska removed any prefix from the name resulting in the name Brod. Today its official name is just Brod, without either prefix Bosanski or Srpski.
The Croatian town of Slavonski Brod is situated on the opposite (northern) bank of the Sava, forming a built-up area of more than 110,000 inhabitants.

The bridge over the Sava River at Brod was destroyed in the early hours of October 1992; it was rebuilt several years later after the hostilities ended.

Settlements
Aside from the town of Brod, the following settlements comprise the municipality:

 Brusnica Mala
 Brusnica Velika
 Donja Barica
 Donja Močila
 Donja Vrela
 Donje Kolibe
 Donji Klakar
 Gornja Barica
 Gornja Močila
 Gornja Vrela
 Gornje Kolibe
 Gornji Klakar
 Grk
 Koraće
 Kričanovo
 Kruščik
 Liješće
 Novo Selo
 Sijekovac
 Unka
 Vinska
 Zborište

Demographics

Population

Ethnic composition

Administrative areas
The Municipality of Brod according to population census from 1991, had twenty-three inhabited settlements, divided into twelve local communities:

City local communities
 MZ Brodsko Polje 1
 MZ Brodsko Polje 2
 MZ Brod - downtown
 MZ Karađorđevo
 MZ Rit
 MZ Tulek

Rural communities
 MZ Gornji Klakar 
 MZ Donji Klakar 
 MZ Gornje Kolibe 
 MZ Donje Kolibe 
 MZ Koraće
 MZ Liješće
 MZ Novo Selo
 MZ Sijekovac 
 MZ Vinska 
 MZ Unka
 MZ Gornja Vrela 
 MZ Grk
 MZ Barica

Notable residents
 Duško Trifunović, children's writer and poet
 Sead Mašić, football player
 Edin Mujčin, football player
 Ljupko Petrović, football coach
 Velibor Vidić, boxer, bronze medal winner for Bosnia and Herzegovina at the 2009 Mediterranean Games
 Zdravko Zovko, handball coach

See also
 Municipalities of Republika Srpska
 Sijekovac killings

References

Sources

External links

 
Populated places in Brod, Bosnia and Herzegovina
Cities and towns in Republika Srpska
Divided cities
Bosnia and Herzegovina–Croatia border crossings